Tangletown may refer to:

Tangletown, Minneapolis, neighborhood in Minneapolis, Minnesota
Tangletown, Saint Paul, neighborhood in Saint Paul, Minnesota
Tangletown, Seattle, neighborhood in Seattle, Washington
Tangletown, Vermont, unincorporated area in Middlesex, Washington County, Vermont